Michael von Grünigen (born 11 April 1969) is a Swiss former alpine skier. He is considered to be the most successful Giant Slalom skier of his era: In 1996, 1997, 1999 and 2003, he won the World Cup in Giant Slalom. In 1997 and 2001, he was World Champion in Giant Slalom. He took a total of 23 World Cup wins during his career. Having originally announced his retirement at the 2002 Winter Olympics in Salt Lake City, after failing to medal at the Games he elected to delay his retirement for a year, ending his competitive career in 2003.

Biography
Von Grünigen is originally from the Bernese Highlands of Switzerland, and comes from a skiing family: his parents were both ski instructors, and one of his three sisters is fellow alpine skier Christine von Grünigen. He is married to Anna, and the couple have three children: Noel, Elio and Lian. Since retiring from competition, he has worked in a number of roles with his equipment sponsor, Fischer, and also works with young skiers for the Swiss Ski Federation.

World Cup victories

World Cups

Individual races

References

External links
 
 

1969 births
Living people
Swiss male alpine skiers
Olympic alpine skiers of Switzerland
Olympic bronze medalists for Switzerland
Alpine skiers at the 1992 Winter Olympics
Alpine skiers at the 1994 Winter Olympics
Alpine skiers at the 1998 Winter Olympics
Alpine skiers at the 2002 Winter Olympics
Olympic medalists in alpine skiing
FIS Alpine Ski World Cup champions
Medalists at the 1998 Winter Olympics
Sportspeople from the canton of Bern
Michael